Sönke Rix (born 3 December 1975) is a German politician of the Social Democratic Party (SPD) who has been serving as a member of the Bundestag from the state of Schleswig-Holstein since 2005.

Political career 
Rix first became a member of the Bundestag in the 2005 German federal election. He has since been a member of the Committee on Family, Senior Citizens, Women and Youth. Since 2014, he has been serving as his parliamentary group’s family, senior citizens, women and youth.

Within the SPD parliamentary group, Rix belongs to the Parliamentary Left, a left-wing movement.

In the negotiations to form a fourth coalition government under the leadership of Chancellor Angela Merkel following the 2017 federal elections, Rix was part of the working group on families, women, seniors and youth, led by Annette Widmann-Mauz, Angelika Niebler and Katarina Barley.

Since 2019, Rix has been serving as deputy chairman of the SPD in Schleswig-Holstein. Ahead of the 2021 elections, he was elected to lead the SPD's campaign in Schleswig-Holstein.

In the negotiations to form a so-called traffic light coalition of the SPD, the Green Party and the Free Democratic Party (FDP) following the 2021 German elections, Rix was again part of his party's delegation in the working group on children, youth and families, this time co-chaired by Serpil Midyatli, Katrin Göring-Eckardt and Stephan Thomae. Since December 2021, he has been serving as one his parliamentary group's deputy chairs, under the leadership of chairman Rolf Mützenich.

Other activities 
 German United Services Trade Union (ver.di), Member
 Greenpeace, Member

References

External links 

  
 Bundestag biography 

1975 births
Living people
Members of the Bundestag for Schleswig-Holstein
Members of the Bundestag 2017–2021
Members of the Bundestag 2013–2017
Members of the Bundestag 2009–2013
Members of the Bundestag 2005–2009
Members of the Bundestag for the Social Democratic Party of Germany
Members of the Bundestag 2021–2025